The 1950 Internationale Tulpenrallye was the 2nd Internationale Tulpenrallye. It was won again by Ken Wharton.

Results

References

Internationale
Rally competitions in the Netherlands